Kingston upon Hull City Police was the police force responsible for policing the city of Kingston upon Hull in northern England until 1974, when it was amalgamated under the Local Government Act 1972 with parts of other forces to form the Humberside Police.

The first chief police officer was Alexander McManus (1836–1866) and the last (1962 until amalgamation) Robert Walton. There is a memorial within Clough Road Police Station to the officers from the force who died during the First World War.

Notes

External links
 Alumni Association
 Yorkshire Film Archive

Former officers
 Ken Brown
 William Vinter

Defunct police forces of England
History of Kingston upon Hull